Midland is a town in southern Cabarrus County in the U.S. state of North Carolina. Located in the Charlotte region of North Carolina, Midland is a 30-minute commute to uptown Charlotte. The name of the town is derived from its location approximately halfway between Charlotte and Oakboro on the railroad line. The population was 3,073 at the 2010 census.

Visitors and new residents to the area are often surprised to learn the local pronunciation of the town's name. In local parlance, "Midland" is pronounced as a spondee, with nearly equal verbal emphasis on both first and last syllables. Other Midlands around the country, including those in Texas and Michigan, are generally pronounced with emphasis on the first syllable. While Midlanders may refer to "MID-lind," Texas, they themselves live in "MID-LAND," North Carolina.

The U.S. Postal Service has maintained a post office in Midland for many years (ZIP code 28107), and rural mail routes extend from Midland into portions of four counties.

History 

Midland began as a railroad town about 1913 with the arrival of rail service via the North Carolina Railroad (NCRR). The town is now incorporated, as of 2000. Prior to Midland's becoming a railroad village, a community named Garmon existed in the area (a few miles to the east) around the Garmon Mill begun by Michael Garmon in the late-1700s, and Garmon appears on an 1864 map of North Carolina. Another community located to the west, Cabarrus Station, also predated Midland as a railroad stop, and has been incorporated into the town of Midland.

Formerly, the economy of Midland was essentially agricultural with some textile-related manufacturing jobs. With the growth of Charlotte to the west, farming has played a decreasing role in the economic life of the town. Increasingly, Midland has become a bedroom community for those commuting to work  in nearby Charlotte and Concord. For many years, there were very few "outsiders" moving to Midland, but over the past two decades, many people with no familial roots in the area have settled there. New residents are attracted to the area for its lower taxes, less expensive housing and real estate prices, and a more rural flavor than that which is to be found in Charlotte or the surrounding larger communities.

The Reed Gold Mine, site of the first discovery of gold in the United States, is located east of the town. The Reed Gold Mine is now a historic site under state management and is open to the public. Visitors to the mine can tour a museum with extensive information and displays on North Carolina gold mining, and can walk through several hundred feet of mine tunnels. The area was an important gold mining center in the 19th century; however, gold mining activity in the region predates the founding of Midland.

The Bethel Church Arbor, John Bunyan Green Farm, and Robert Harvey Morrison Farm and Pioneer Mills Gold Mine are listed on the National Register of Historic Places.

Geography
The climate in Midland is temperate, with chilly winters and hot summers. Thunderstorms are frequent in warmer weather. Severe weather occurs occasionally, and a few tornadoes have been recorded in Midland and its vicinity. Snow accumulations occur on occasion in the winter, and anywhere from zero to three significant accumulations of snow might reasonably be expected in an average winter. Accumulating snows generally melt away between snow events, and there is no consistent snowpack in winter. Pleasantly warm daytime temperatures may be experienced into November.

The land is gently rolling with no especially high points. The most common soil type is a red clay. The area is drained by the Rocky River, which is relatively small and generally shallow. Trees are abundant. There are no significant lakes in the town.

US Highway 601 and NC 24/27 are the major highways. There are two traffic signals in the town - one at the intersection of Highway 601 and State Road 24/27, which is north of Midland proper and was once known locally as "Hell's Half Acre", and the other at the intersection of State Road 24/27 and Bethel Church Road.

Midland has a very small downtown area along Kingsbury Drive. There are four buildings along the road in the area as well as parking spaces and a crosswalk.

Demographics

2020 census

As of the 2020 United States census, there were 4,684 people, 1,182 households, and 912 families residing in the town.

Economy
During the past two decades, Midland has become an industrial manufacturing hub within the Charlotte region.  Corning operates a large-scale fiber-optic cable manufacturing plant in Midland that underwent a $50M expansion in 2012.  Intertape Polymer Group announced in 2016 that they would build a $49M advanced manufacturing plant for the e-commerce sector north of the Corning plant.

Transportation

Transportation to Midland is limited to automobile traffic. The town is no longer served by passenger rail service, and there is no public general aviation airport within . Commercial flights to the area are usually handled through the airport at Charlotte, approximately one hour's drive to the west. Charlotte Douglas International Airport has several hundred passenger flights per day with nonstop service to many locations in North America as well as service to Europe and the Caribbean basin. Some air passengers also use the new Concord-Padgett Regional Airport, which has limited passenger air service, the Piedmont Triad airport at Greensboro, or at Raleigh/Durham, although these latter airports are two hours or more travel time by automobile.

Nearby recreation includes access to lakes, museums, professional sports, and extensive shopping in surrounding areas. The beaches of both Carolinas are popular vacation destinations. The Appalachian Mountains of North Carolina rise to the west and are also a popular vacation or day-trip destination. The cool, verdant heights of the Appalachian Mountains provide relief from the summer heat of the Piedmont and also winter recreation such as snow skiing.

References

External links 
 
Bethel Glen | A Cabarrus County Neighborhood - Midland, NC
Joyce and Jim Lavene - Midland authors

Towns in Cabarrus County, North Carolina
Mining communities in North Carolina
Populated places established in 1913
1913 establishments in North Carolina
Towns in North Carolina